Mary Mayberry (March 29, 1907 – May 4, 1972) was an American film actress of the silent era. She was also billed as Mary Mabery in five films.

After appearing in a number of shorts, she played the female lead in several westerns alongside Bob Custer and other stars.

Selected filmography
 Law of the Mounted (1928)
 The Law's Lash (1928)
 Captain Careless (1928)
 Manhattan Cowboy (1928)
 Dog Law (1928)
 Lightning Speed (1928)
 Texas Tommy (1928)
 Headin' Westward  (1929)
 Midnight Daddies (1930)

References

Bibliography
 John J. McGowan. J.P. McGowan: Biography of a Hollywood Pioneer. McFarland, 2005.

External links

1907 births
1972 deaths
American film actresses
People from New York City
20th-century American actresses
Western (genre) film actresses